A carbapenam is a β-lactam compound that is a saturated carbapenem. They exist primarily as biosynthetic intermediates on the way to the carbapenem antibiotics.

References

Carbapenem antibiotics